Forward Tyrol is an Austrian political party active in Tyrol. It was founded by Anna Hosp (ÖVP), Hans Lindenberger (SPÖ) and Christine Oppitz-Plörer (ÖVP) in the run-up of the 2013 state election. In the election the party obtained 9.3% of the vote and four members of the local Landtag.

References

External links
 Official website

Political parties in Austria
Political parties established in 2013